Liljana Kondakçi is an Albanian singer and actress, famous for being a winner of the 18th Festivali i Këngës. She is a Merited Artist of Albania.
 
Kondakçi was born in 1950. In 2010 she was arrested in Thessaloniki, Greece and extradited to Italy because of an international arrest warrant released from Catanzaro's pubblico ministero Vincenzo Antonio Lombardo, and antimafia prosecutor, Vincenzo Luberto.

References

20th-century Albanian women singers
Merited Artists of Albania
Living people
Albanian people imprisoned abroad
People extradited from Greece
People extradited to Italy
Year of birth missing (living people)
Festivali i Këngës winners